Lodhi (Lodi, Lohi, Lozi) is a Munda language, or dialect cluster, of India. Kharia Thar is only spoken by one quarter of ethnic Lodhi in Orissa. However, while admitting that Lodhi is related to Sora, a Munda language, Ethnologue classifies it as Indic (Bengali–Assamese), and it is considered a variety of Hindi in the Indian census. It may be that there are both Munda and Indic varieties subsumed under the name Lodhi.

However, Anderson (2008:299) suggests that Lodhi (Lodha) of northern Orissa may be an endangered Munda language; some members use the autonym Sabar or Sabara.

Locations
Lodhi is spoken in:
Morada and Suliapada, Sadar subdivision, Mayurbhanj district, Odisha
Sora block, Balasore district, Odisha
Binpur and Kharagpur-I blocks in West Medinipur district, West Bengal
Jharkhand (along the West Bengal border)

References

Sources 
Anderson, Gregory D.S (ed). 2008. The Munda languages. Routledge Language Family Series 3.New York: Routledge. .

Munda languages